Željko Trajković (born October 8, 1966) is a retired Serbian wrestler who competed in the 1992 Summer Olympics as an Independent Olympic participant.

References

1966 births
Living people
Olympic wrestlers as Independent Olympic Participants
Wrestlers at the 1992 Summer Olympics
Serbian male sport wrestlers
World Wrestling Championships medalists